Julio A. Concepcion is an American politician and businessman serving as a member of the Connecticut House of Representatives from the 4th district. He assumed office on June 12, 2018.

Early life and education 
Concepcion was born in Puerto Rico and raised in Hartford, Connecticut. He earned a Bachelor of Arts degree in political science from the University of Connecticut.

Career 
From 2005 to 2007, Concepcion worked as a community liaison and assistant for the mayor of Hartford. He has since worked as the vice president of the MetroHartford Alliance. Concepcion also served as a member of the Hartford Town Committee. He assumed office in the Connecticut House of Representatives on June 12, 2018. In the 2019–2020 legislative session, Concepcion served as vice chair of the Finance, Revenue and Bonding Committee. In the 2021–2022 session, he is the co-chair of the Executive and Legislative Nominations Committee.

References 

Living people
Year of birth missing (living people)
People from Hartford, Connecticut
Politicians from Hartford, Connecticut
University of Connecticut alumni
Democratic Party members of the Connecticut House of Representatives